Last of the Breed is a two-disc album by American country music artists Willie Nelson, Merle Haggard and Ray Price, released in 2007. It debuted at number 64 on the U.S. Billboard 200, selling about 13,000 copies in its first week. The album has 100,000 copies in the U.S. as of May 2015. The album was ranked number 33 on Rolling Stones list of the Top 50 Albums of 2007.

Critical reception

Mark Demming of Allmusic wrote "...at its best Last of the Breed really sounds the way these things did in the old days, and Nelson, Haggard, and Price achieve something more than nostalgia—they offer a stirring reminder of the strength of this music when country music spoke to something deeper than just a marketing demographic." In his review, music critic Robert Christgau wrote "Not much kidding around here—they're feeling their varying ages. But they ain't dead yet." Steven Deusner writes of the style, "...most of these songs sound like the trio are trying to re-create a style long past rather anchor these songs in the here and now. That retrospective orientation is strange because none of these artists could be accused of being stuck in the past; in fact, their willingness to adapt to new styles without compromising their standards is partly what makes them the last of their breed. So it's a shame Last of the Breed isn't better—not only do they have a lot to say about these old songs, they also have a lot to say through them." While Jonathan Keefe of Slant takes issue with the title, he praises the album, calling it "a collection that's nearly flawless in its execution."

Track listing

Disc one
 "My Life's Been a Pleasure" (Jesse Ashlock) – 3:03
 "My Mary" (Jimmie Davis, Stuart Hamblen) – 3:14
 "Back to Earth" (Willie Nelson) – 3:25
 "Heartaches by the Number" (Harlan Howard) – 3:04
 "Mom and Dad's Waltz" (Lefty Frizzell) – 3:26
 "Some Other World" (Floyd Tillman) – 3:26
 "Why Me" (Kris Kristofferson) – 3:44
 "Lost Highway" (Leon Payne) – 2:54
 "I Love You a Thousand Ways" (Frizzell, Jim Beck) – 2:57
 "Please Don't Leave Me Any More Darlin'" (Ashlock) – 3:34
 "I Gotta Have My Baby Back" (Tillman) – 3:12

Disc two
 "Goin' Away Party" (Cindy Walker) – 3:25
 "If I Ever Get Lucky" (Merle Haggard, Lou Bradley) – 4:11
 "Sweet Memories" (Mickey Newbury)  – 3:24
 "Pick Me Up on Your Way Down" (Howard) – 3:16
 "I Love You Because" (Payne) – 3:03
 "Sweet Jesus" (Haggard) – 3:38
 "Still Water Runs the Deepest" (Ashlock) – 2:40
 "I Love You So Much It Hurts" (Tillman) – 3:10
 "That Silver-Haired Daddy of Mine" (Gene Autry, Jimmy Long) – 3:25
 "I'll Keep on Loving You" (Tillman) – 3:05
 "Night Watch" (Walker) – 2:47

Personnel
 Merle Haggard – vocals, guitar
 Ray Price – vocals
 Willie Nelson – vocals, gut string guitar
 Eddie Bayers – drums
 Buddy Emmons – pedal steel guitar
 Vince Gill – harmony vocals (on "Heartaches by the Number")
 Johnny Gimble – fiddle, mandolin
 Aubrey Haynie – fiddle, mandolin
 John Hobbs – keyboards, Hammond organ, Wurlitzer
 Elana James – fiddle
 The Jordanaires – background vocals
 Kris Kristofferson – vocals, harmony vocals (on "Why Me")
 Brent Mason – electric guitar
 Gordon Mote – piano
 Don Potter – acoustic guitar
 Boots Randolph – saxophone
 Michael Rhodes – bass
 D. Bergen White – chant

Production and additional personnel
 Fred Foster – producer, mixing
 Hank Williams; mastering
 Brent Maher – engineer, mixing
 Charles Yingling – engineer, mixing assistant
 Brian Krause – assistant engineer, mixing assistant

Chart performance

Awards
Willie Nelson and Ray Price won a Grammy for Best Country Collaboration with Vocals for the song "Lost Highway."

References

2007 albums
Willie Nelson albums
Merle Haggard albums
Ray Price (musician) albums
Albums produced by Fred Foster
Lost Highway Records albums
Collaborative albums